Ippei Watanabe may refer to:

, Japanese footballer
, Japanese swimmer